Cristina Musteață (née Dolgovici; born 22 June 1985) is a Moldovan footballer who plays as a centre-back and has appeared for the Moldova women's national team.

Career
Musteață has been capped for the Moldova national team, appearing for the team during the 2019 FIFA Women's World Cup qualifying cycle.

See also
List of Moldova women's international footballers

References

External links
 
 
 

1985 births
Living people
Moldovan women's footballers
Women's association football central defenders
Agarista-ȘS Anenii Noi players
Moldova women's international footballers